TV Catchup may refer to
Internet television, often referred to as catch up TV
TVCatchup, a company offering Internet television products
The Catch-Up, a talk show on Australian daytime television
Catch Up, a Canadian children's TV series